Ian Morrison may refer to:
Ian Morrison (journalist) (1913–1950), Australian journalist
Ian Morrison (footballer) (born 1954), Australian rules footballer
Scotty Morrison (Ian Morrison, born 1930), former National Hockey League referee and vice president
Ian Beausoleil-Morrison, associate professor of mechanical and aerospace engineering
Ian Morrison (RNZAF officer) (1914–1997), senior officer of the Royal New Zealand Air Force

See also
Iain Morrison (born 1983), rugby league player
Iain Morrison (musician), Scottish musician
Iain Morrison (rugby union) (born 1962), Scottish rugby union player